Brian Netherton (27 January 1942 – 16 September 2011) was an English professional darts player.

Career
Netherton was a Cornish darts player who first came to prominence when he won the News of the World Darts Championship in 1972 at the Alexandra Palace in London. This was the first year in which the tournament was televised in the UK, by ITV. Netherton represented the Welcome Home Inn from Par in Cornwall. He defeated John Walker in the semi-finals before triumphing over Welshman Alan Evans 2–0 in the final.

Netherton also won the Swedish Open in 1972, defeating Swede Ingemar Bjorling 2–1 in the final. He never played in the World Championship but continued to play in his native Cornwall.

References

External links
Profile and stats on Darts Database

Sportspeople from Cornwall
1942 births
2011 deaths
English darts players
British Darts Organisation players
People from Tywardreath and Par